Engstlensee is a natural lake used as a reservoir in the municipality of Innertkirchen, Bernese Oberland, Switzerland. It is located near Joch Pass at an elevation of 1850 m. It can be reached by gondola and by foot from Titlis.

The reservoir has a volume of 10.7 million m³ whereof 2 million m³ are used for electricity production.

The water of the Engstlensee passes through a tunnel in the neighbouring Gadmental valley before being used in the Fuhren, Hopflauenen and Innertkirchen power stations.

In Literature
An inn  on the shore of the Engstlensee is the scene of a crucial meeting between the protagonists of H. G. Wells' 1913 novel The Passionate Friends.

See also
List of lakes of Switzerland
List of mountain lakes of Switzerland

References

External links
Lake Engstlen

Bernese Oberland
Lakes of Switzerland
Lakes of the canton of Bern
LEngstlensee